Ceranemota is a genus of moths belonging to the subfamily Thyatirinae of the Drepanidae.

Species
 Ceranemota improvisa Edwards, 1873
 Ceranemota fasciata Barnes & McDunnough, 1910
 Ceranemota crumbi Benjamin, 1938
 Ceranemota semifasciata Benjamin, 1938
 Ceranemota tearlei Edwards, 1888
 Ceranemota partida Clarke, 1938
 Ceranemota albertae Clarke, 1938
 Ceranemota amplifascia Clarke, 1938

References

Thyatirinae
Drepanidae genera